Bacillus azotoformans is a species of bacteria within the genus Bacillus. Novel nitrite reductases have been isolated from strains of this species.

This species has been recently transferred into the genus Schinkia. The correct nomenclature is Schinkia azotoformans.

References

External links
Type strain of Bacillus azotoformans at BacDive -  the Bacterial Diversity Metadatabase

azotoformans
Bacteria described in 1983